Jerome is an unincorporated community in Appanoose County, Iowa, United States.

Notable person

Kenneth Owen (1918-2001), Iowa farmer and politician, was born in Jerome.

Notes

Unincorporated communities in Appanoose County, Iowa
Unincorporated communities in Iowa